Beyond the Sky is a 2018 American science fiction film written and directed by Fulvio Sestito in his directorial debut. The film stars Ryan Carnes, Jordan Hinson, Claude Duhamel, Martin Sensmeier, Don Stark, Peter Stormare, and Dee Wallace. It was acquired by RLJE Films in 2018 and was released on September 21, 2018. The working title was FMS-False Memory Syndrome.

Plot 
The film follows a documentary filmmaker and his crew as they seek to expose the lies of alien abductees and their encounter with a young woman whose dark secret leads them to uncover a disturbing truth.

Cast 
 Ryan Carnes as Chris Norton
 Jordan Hinson as Emily Reed
 Claude Duhamel as Brent
 Martin Sensmeier as Kyle Blackburn
 Don Stark as Bill Johnson
 Peter Stormare as Peter Norton
 Dee Wallace as Lucille

Production and release 
Beyond the Sky is Sestito's debut feature film. Filming was completed in Los Angeles, California and various locations in Arizona and New Mexico.

References

External links 

Beyond the Sky at Facebook
Beyond the Sky at The Numbers

2018 films
2018 science fiction films
Alien abduction films
American science fiction films
Films scored by Don Davis (composer)
Films shot in New Mexico
2010s English-language films
2010s American films
English-language science fiction films